Glucokinase regulator is a protein that in humans is encoded by the GCKR gene.

Function
This gene encodes a protein belonging to the GCKR subfamily of the SIS (sugar isomerase) family of proteins. The gene product is a regulatory protein that inhibits glucokinase in liver and pancreatic islet cells by binding non-covalently to form an inactive complex with the enzyme. This gene is considered a susceptibility gene candidate for a form of maturity onset diabetes of the young (MODY). [provided by RefSeq, Jul 2008].

References

Further reading